Fine structure theory may refer to:
Fine structure, a property in quantum physics
Fine structure theory, the study of the levels of the Jensen hierarchy of sets in set theory